La Asunta Municipality is the fifth municipal section of the Sud Yungas Province in the  La Paz Department, Bolivia. Its seat is La Asunta.

References 

 Instituto Nacional de Estadistica de Bolivia

Municipalities of La Paz Department (Bolivia)